Stilboma smaragdus is a species of beetle in the stilboma genus.

References

Lebiinae
Beetles described in 1933